Jackson Lake may refer to:

Places
Jackson Lake (Georgia)
Jackson Lake (Wyoming)
 Jackson Lake Dam, Wyoming
 Jackson Lake Lodge, Wyoming, a U.S. National Historic Place
 Jackson Lake Ranger Station, Wyoming, a U.S. National Historic Place
Jackson Lake, Colorado
Jackson Lake State Park (Colorado)
Jackson Lake State Park (Ohio)

Television
 Jackson Lake (Doctor Who), a character played by David Morrissey in the Doctor Who Christmas special "The Next Doctor"

See also 
Lake Jackson (disambiguation)
Andrew Jackson State Park Lake, South Carolina
Lake Jackson Mounds Archaeological State Park, Florida
Stonewall Jackson Lake State Park in West Virginia